= Jewish Funeral House in Gliwice =

Building in Gliwice, Silesia, Poland

- Dom Przedpogrzebowy w Gliwicach
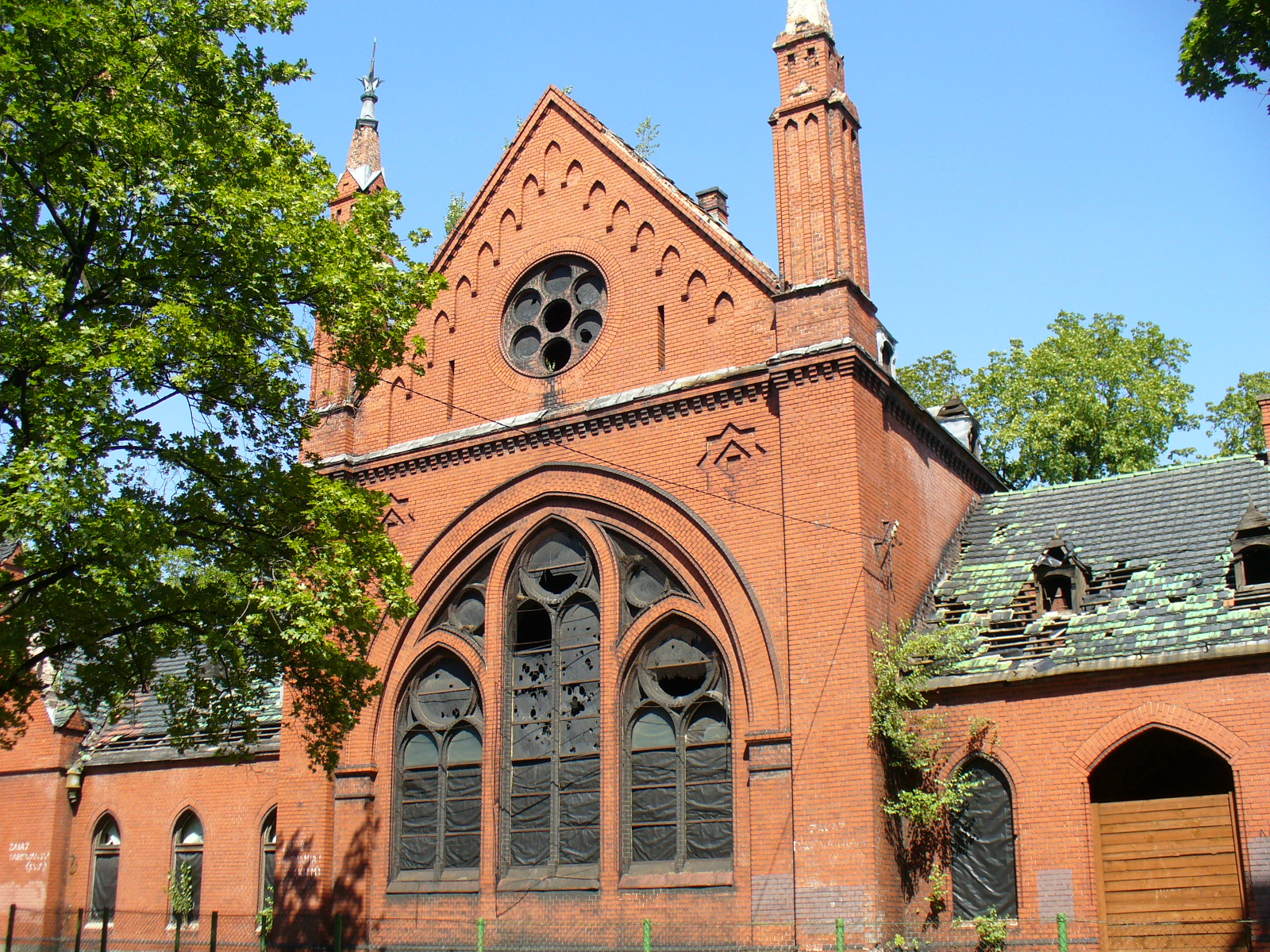
- Jewish funeral house in Gliwice
- Interactive map of the Jewish Funeral House in Gliwice area

General information
- Architectural style: Neo-Gothic
- Location: 14 Poniatowskiego Street, Gliwice, Poland
- Coordinates: 50.30325°N 18.69328°E
- Completed: 1903
- Owner: City of Gliwice

Design and construction
- Architect: Max Fleischer

Jewish Funeral House in Gliwice (also known as the Little Synagogue) is a historic Jewish funeral building from 1903 located at 14 Poniatowskiego Street in Gliwice, Poland, adjacent to the New Jewish Cemetery in Gliwice.

The protected monument comprises the funeral house building of the former Jewish cemetery complex.

== History ==
The building was designed by the Viennese architect Max Fleischer. Construction was carried out by the building firm of Julius Scheer of Gliwice, under the supervision of Johann Miedel (architect), Andreas Holzenpfeil and Oskar Stanjura.

On 15 November 1903 the Jewish cemetery and its buildings were ceremonially opened and consecrated. During World War II the building was used as a military warehouse. In 2007 the funeral house was transferred by the Jewish community to the city of Gliwice. Following conservation and restoration works carried out between 2012 and 2016, the building now houses the Upper Silesian Jews House of Memory, a branch of the Gliwice Museum.

In 2016 the Upper Silesian Jews House of Memory won the “Best Public Space of the Silesian Voivodeship” award in the category of revitalised public building.

== Heritage status ==
The building is entered in the register of historic monuments of Poland as:

- No. A/87/03 of 8 May 2003 — funeral house in Gliwice.
